{|

{{Infobox ship career
| Hide header              = 
| Ship name                = Carnival Magic
|Ship country=Panama
|Ship flag=
| Ship renamed             =
| Ship owner               = Carnival Corporation & plc 
| Ship operator            = Carnival Cruise Line
| Ship registry            = 
| Ship route               = 
| Ship ordered             = 2007
| Ship builder             = Fincantieri, Monfalcone , Italy
| Ship original cost       = US$740 million
| Ship yard number         = 6167
| Ship way number          = 
| Ship laid down           = 20 November 2008
| Ship launched            = 27 August 2010
| Ship completed           = 29 April 2011
| Ship christened          = 1 May 2011, by Godmother Lindsey Wilkerson
| Ship acquired            = 
| Ship maiden voyage       = 1 May 2011
| Ship in service          = 2011–present
| Ship out of service      = 
| Ship identification      =*Call sign: 3ETA8

| Ship fate                = 
| Ship status              = In Service
| Ship notes               =  
}}

The ship was named and christened in Venice by her godmother Lindsey Wilkerson, a former patient and current researcher at St. Jude's Children's Research Hospital.Carnival Magic was laid down on 20 November 2008, launched from her drydock on 27 August 2010 and completed on 29 April 2011. Sea trials were undertaken between 17 and 20 March 2011. She has 1,845 passenger cabins and 746 crew cabins, and can carry over 6,000 persons in total.

The lifeboat configuration of Carnival Magic differs from that of her sister ship, in that Carnival Magic has 18 double-size lifeboats, while Carnival Dream has 30 smaller boats.  Carnival Magic also has a large, highly visible SkyCourse ropes course forward of her funnel that is not present on her sister.

There are 19 decks (although marked as having 15 decks on the deck plan because there is no "Deck 13" on Carnival ships) aboard Carnival Magic.

 Drydock refurbishment Carnival Magic was dry-docked in June 2016 which included refurbishment of some public areas. During the suspension of service due to COVID-19, she underwent a second dry dock for expansion of the casino area, in addition to obtaining the blue/white livery seen on the cruise line's other ship Mardi Gras.Cruising areasCarnival Magic spent her inaugural season, summer 2011, cruising the Mediterranean Sea. She then made a transatlantic crossing in autumn, 2011, and was homeported in Galveston, Texas from which she made Caribbean Sea cruises. In April, 2016, her homeport changed to Port Canaveral, Florida from which she continued making Caribbean cruises.Carnival Magic re-positioned to Miami, Florida in September 2018, sailing 7-day eastern and western Caribbean cruises. She was expected to move homeport to Fort Lauderdale, Florida in May 2019.

As of February 2021, itineraries include trips from Port Canaveral (Orlando, FL) to the Caribbean; New York to Bermuda, Canada, and New England; and Norfolk to The Bahamas, Bermuda, and the Caribbean starting in November 2021.

Following Carnival's suspension of service due to COVID-19, Carnival Magic recommenced cruises on 7 August 2021 with sailings from Port Canaveral to The Bahamas.

 Incidents and accidents 
On 2 July 2013, during a seven-day Caribbean cruise, a 39-year-old male guest died when he accidentally fell from his cabin balcony and landed on an open deck area three decks below.

In October 2014 a Texas Health Presbyterian Hospital Dallas employee who may have handled lab specimens from Ebola victim Thomas Eric Duncan after he boarded the ship on 12 October in Galveston. The hospital employee and her spouse showed no signs of the virus, but voluntarily quarantined themselves on the ship. The ship was allowed to dock in Belize, but the quarantined couple was refused the ability to disembark; thus derailing the plan to offload the couple for a flight home. Mexico went a step further and did not grant docking privileges to the ship. A United States Coast Guard helicopter flew to Carnival Magic'' on 18 October to obtain blood samples. The following day the Texas Health Presbyterian Hospital employee and her spouse were allowed to disembark in Galveston after the tests were determined to be negative for both the employee and her spouse.

References

External links 

 

 

2010 ships
Magic
Ships built in Monfalcone
Ships built by Fincantieri